Huang Chunsen (born 1991) is a Chinese ski mountaineer, and member of the national selection of the People's Republic of China. He studies at Shenyang Sport University in Shenyang.

Selected results 
 2009:
 2nd, Asian Championship, relay (mixed teams), together with Cui Xiaodi, Xin Detao and  Jin Yubo
 3rd, Asian Championship, individual,
 4th, Asian Championship, vertical race

External links 
 Huang Chunsen, skimountaineering.org

References 

1991 births
Living people
Chinese male ski mountaineers